I Am Dynamite! A Life of Nietzsche is a 2018 biography of Friedrich Nietzsche written by Sue Prideaux and published by Faber & Faber in 2018.

Reviews

External links 
 
 Interview with the author on the New Books Network

2018 non-fiction books
Books about Friedrich Nietzsche
English-language books
Faber and Faber books
Tim Duggan Books books